Genavi (also Romanized as Genāvī; also known as Ganaveh and Gināvi) is a village in Howmeh Rural District, in the Central District of Deyr County, Bushehr Province, Iran. At the 2006 census, its population was 66, in 15 families.

References 

Populated places in Deyr County